Stephen Clark Maxson is an American behavior geneticist and professor emeritus of psychology at the University of Connecticut. He first joined the faculty of the University of Connecticut in 1969 as an assistant professor. He is known for his research on the link between aggression and the Y chromosome in mice, for which he received the Dobzhansky Award from the Behavior Genetics Association in 1998.

References

Living people
21st-century American psychologists
Behavior geneticists
University of Chicago alumni
University of Connecticut faculty
American geneticists
Year of birth missing (living people)